Seana Kofoed (born August 13, 1970 in Wilmette, Illinois) is an American television and stage actress.

Early life

Kofoed was raised in the Chicago area and attended New Trier High School, Northwestern University and the Royal National Theatre in London. She began her stage career in Chicago, appearing in productions at the Goodman Theatre, the Court Theatre and the Victory Gardens Theater, before moving to New York City.

Later career

In New York, Kofoed was best known for productions on and off Broadway. Her Broadway credits include Proof with Jennifer Jason Leigh and Night Must Fall with Matthew Broderick. Off Broadway credits include several productions at Manhattan Theatre Club, the Atlantic Theatre Company, and Manhattan Class Company, in addition to experiences in Glimmer, Glimmer, and Shine with the late John Spencer and An Experiment with an Air Pump, for which she received a Drama Desk Nomination for Best Supporting Actress.

Kofoed soon made the transition to on-camera acting, making an appearance on Law & Order: Special Victims Unit and lending her voice to a small role in the movie Shark Tale. In 2006, she was cast in the hit dramedy Men in Trees, playing the lead character Marin's (Anne Heche) editor and best friend, Jane.

in 2018, Kofoed was cast as a series regular on Lifetime's American Princess.

Personal life
Kofoed is married to actor Jason Antoon; they have two children.

Filmography

Film

Television

External links

References

1970 births
American film actresses
American television actresses
American stage actresses
Living people
Actresses from Illinois
People from Wilmette, Illinois
New Trier High School alumni
Northwestern University alumni
20th-century American actresses
21st-century American actresses
American people of Swedish descent